
Gmina Szczurowa is a rural gmina (administrative district) in Brzesko County, Lesser Poland Voivodeship, in southern Poland.

Villages
Gmina Szczurowa contains the villages and settlements of Barczków, Dąbrówka Morska, Dołęga, Górka, Kopacze Wielkie, Księże Kopacze, Kwików, Niedzieliska, Pojawie, Popędzyna, Rajsko, Rudy-Rysie, Rylowa, Rząchowa, Strzelce Małe, Strzelce Wielkie, Szczurowa, Uście Solne, Wola Przemykowska, Wrzępia and Zaborów.

Neighbouring gminas
Gmina Szczurowa is bordered by the gminas of Bochnia, Borzęcin, Brzesko, Drwinia, Koszyce, Radłów, Rzezawa and Wietrzychowice.

References
Polish official population figures 2006

Szczurowa
Brzesko County